Kevin Gray may refer to:

 Kevin Gray (actor) (1958–2013), American actor
 Kevin Gray (footballer) (born 1972), English footballer
 Kevin Gray (mastering engineer)
 Kevin Gray (visual artist) (born 1982), German visual artist
 Kevin Francis Gray (born 1972), Irish artist